The 1992 Spanish motorcycle Grand Prix was the fourth round of the 1992 Grand Prix motorcycle racing season. It took place on the weekend of 8–10 May 1992 at the Jerez circuit.

500 cc race report
Mick Doohan was on pole, and got the lead at the start from Wayne Rainey and Kevin Schwantz. Doohan then opened a gap to Rainey, who in turn had a gap to a fight for 3rd between Schwantz and Àlex Crivillé. Crivillé retired and Niall Mackenzie went up to 3rd. Doohan won the race for his 4th win in a row.

500 cc classification

References

Spanish motorcycle Grand Prix
Spanish
Motorcycle